Sergio Salazar (born 17 October 1973) is a Mexican modern pentathlete. He competed at the 1996 Summer Olympics and the 2004 Summer Olympics.

References

1973 births
Living people
Mexican male modern pentathletes
Olympic modern pentathletes of Mexico
Modern pentathletes at the 1996 Summer Olympics
Modern pentathletes at the 2004 Summer Olympics
Sportspeople from Mexico City
Pan American Games medalists in modern pentathlon
Pan American Games bronze medalists for Mexico
Modern pentathletes at the 1999 Pan American Games
Modern pentathletes at the 2003 Pan American Games
Medalists at the 1999 Pan American Games
Medalists at the 2003 Pan American Games
20th-century Mexican people
21st-century Mexican people